Heikki Hulkkonen (born 3 July 1955) is a Finnish modern pentathlete and fencer. He competed both events at the 1976 and 1980 Summer Olympics.

References

External links
 

1955 births
Living people
Finnish male foil fencers
Finnish male modern pentathletes
Olympic fencers of Finland
Olympic modern pentathletes of Finland
Fencers at the 1976 Summer Olympics
Fencers at the 1980 Summer Olympics
Modern pentathletes at the 1976 Summer Olympics
Modern pentathletes at the 1980 Summer Olympics
People from Orimattila
Sportspeople from Päijät-Häme